Gandoman is a city in Chaharmahal and Bakhtiari Province, Iran.

Gandoman may also refer to:
 Gandoman, Baneh, Kurdistan Province
 Gandoman, Sanandaj, Kurdistan Province
 Gandoman, West Azerbaijan
 Gandoman District, in Chaharmahal and Bakhtiari Province
 Gandoman Rural District, in Chaharmahal and Bakhtiari Province